Saeed-ur-Rahman Azmi Nadvi  (born 14 May 1934) is an Indian Islamic scholar who serves as the Principal of Darul Uloom Nadwatul Ulama. He is the Editor of Al-Baas Al-Islami.

Biography
Nadvi was born on 14 May 1934. He received an honorary degree of D Litt from Khwaja Moinuddin Chishti Urdu Arabi-Farsi University on 21 November 2019.

Nadvi is chief editor of Al-Baas Al-Islami. He is also a senior member of the All India Muslim Personal Law Board.

On 15 February 2013, he was conferred with The Lifetime Award by the Institute of Objective Studies, New Delhi.

Literary works
 Islam awr Maghrib

References

Bibliography
 
Saeed Al Azmi Al Nadwi and his contribution to the development of Arabic language and literature, PhD

External links
 Tara-Raqibul nikah un-Islamic, null and void: Seminary head

1934 births
Living people
Darul Uloom Nadwatul Ulama alumni
People from Mau
Al-Azhar University alumni
Deobandis
People from Azamgarh district
Indian Sunni Muslim scholars of Islam